Mr. Mercedes is an American crime drama television series based on the Bill Hodges novel trilogy by Stephen King, which consists of Mr. Mercedes, Finders Keepers, and End of Watch. The series premiered on Audience on August 9, 2017. It was developed by David E. Kelley and stars Brendan Gleeson and Harry Treadaway. In November 2018, it was announced that Audience had renewed the series for a ten-episode third season, which premiered on September 10, 2019. In May 2020, the show was discontinued, with no indication of whether the show had been officially canceled or that it would return for a fourth season. Its existing three seasons were later picked up in September 2020 by streaming service Peacock.

Premise
Retired detective Bill Hodges is still haunted by the unsolved case of "Mr. Mercedes", who claimed 16 lives when he drove a stolen Mercedes through a line of job-seekers at a local job fair. Meanwhile, brilliant young psychopath Brady Hartsfield emerges to focus his attention on Hodges. What begins as an online cat-and-mouse game soon has deadly real-life consequences as an increasingly desperate Hartsfield becomes bent on leaving his mark on the world.

Cast and characters

Main
Actors are credited among main cast only in the episodes in which they appear.
Brendan Gleeson as Kermit William "Bill" Hodges, a retired detective who is contacted by Brady
Harry Treadaway as Brady Hartsfield (seasons 1–2), a psychopathic electronics store worker who is responsible for the Mercedes killings
Holland Taylor as Ida Silver, Hodges' next-door neighbor
Justine Lupe as Holly Gibney, Janey's OCD-afflicted niece that becomes close with Hodges
Jharrel Jerome as Jerome Robinson, Hodges' young, friendly neighbor that becomes involved in his investigation of Brady
Breeda Wool as Lou Linklatter, Brady's sarcastic lesbian coworker
Scott Lawrence as Peter Dixon (seasons 1–2), Hodges' former partner
Robert Stanton as Anthony "Robi" Frobisher (season 1), Brady's invasive boss
Kelly Lynch as Deborah Hartsfield (season 1), Brady's alcoholic, incestuous mother
Mary-Louise Parker as Janey Patterson (season 1), Olivia Trelawney's sister who helps Hodges with his investigation
Maximiliano Hernández as Antonio Montez (seasons 2–3), an assistant district attorney that begins working with Hodges
Jack Huston as Felix Babineau (season 2), a skilled neurosurgeon
Tessa Ferrer as Cora Babineau (season 2), the corrupt head of marketing at a major pharmaceutical corporation and Babineau's wife
Rarmian Newton as Pete Saubers (season 3), a high school student that unwittingly crosses paths with Bellamy
Gabriel Ebert as Morris Bellamy (season 3), a volatile criminal and fan of John Rothstein's books

Recurring
Nancy Travis as Donna Hodges (seasons 1–2), Hodges' estranged ex-wife
Maddie Hasson as Allie Hodges (seasons 1 and 3), Hodges' estranged daughter
Neko Parham as Lawrence Robinson (seasons 1–2), Jerome's protective father
Makayla Lysiak as Barbara Robinson (seasons 1–2), Jerome's sister
Ann Cusack as Olivia Trelawney (season 1), the woman whose Mercedes-Benz was used during Brady's murders
Katharine Houghton as Elizabeth Wharton (season 1), Trelawney and Janey's elderly mother
Laila Robins as Charlotte Gibney (season 1), Holly's controlling mother
Nicole Barré as Izzy Torres (season 1), Dixon's current partner
David Furr as Josh (season 1), a detective
Tammy Arnold as Maggie Wilmer (season 2), a nurse that Hodges befriends
Virginia Kull as Sadie MacDonald (season 2), a timid nurse who suffers from mild epilepsy
Mike Starr as Library Al (season 2), a kind hospital volunteer who distributes books to patients
Adam Stephenson as Jonathan Pettimore (season 2), a hospital administrator
Kate Burton as Mrs. MacDonald (season 2), Sadie's mother
Brett Gelman as Roland Finklestein (season 3), a defense attorney working with Hodges and Holly
Natalie Paul as Sarah Pace (season 3), an assistant district attorney
Glynn Turman as Judge Bernard Raines (season 3), a no-nonsense district judge
Bruce Dern as John Rothstein (season 3), a crude, reclusive bestselling author
Kate Mulgrew as Alma Lane (season 3), a woman who has been grooming Bellamy since he was a teenager
Josh Daugherty as Tom Saubers (season 3), Pete's depressed father who was disabled during Brady's massacre
Claire Bronson as Marjorie Saubers (season 3), Pete's mother
Meg Steedle as Danielle Sweeney (season 3), Bellamy's girlfriend
Patch Darragh as Andrew Halliday (season 3), an associate of Bellamy's who runs a bookstore

Episodes

Season 1 (2017)

Season 2 (2018)

Season 3 (2019)

Production

Development
In 2015, Sonar Entertainment optioned the screen rights to Stephen King's novel Mr. Mercedes with the intent of developing into a limited series. David E. Kelley was set to write the series while Jack Bender would direct. Executive producers were expected to include Kelley, Bender, Marty Bowen, Wyck Godfrey, and Gene Stein. Production companies involved with the series were to include Temple Hill Entertainment and Sonar Entertainment.

On May 25, 2016, it was announced that Audience had given the production a series order for a first season consisting of ten episodes. The previously announced creative team was still expected to be involved. In addition to writing and executive producing, David E. Kelley was also announced to be serving as the series' showrunner. Additional executive producers announced included Christopher Long, Bart Peters, Jenna Glazier, and Tom Patricia. On May 11, 2017, it was announced that the series would premiere on August 9, 2017.

On October 10, 2017, the Audience Network renewed the series for a second season consisting of ten episodes. It will be based on the three novels in the Bill Hodges trilogy, Mr. Mercedes, Finders Keepers and End of Watch. On April 15, 2018, it was announced that the second season would premiere on August 22, 2018. On November 19, 2018, it was announced that Audience had renewed the series for a third season consisting of ten episodes, which premiered on September 10, 2019.

In May 2020, Audience was discontinued, with no indication of whether the show had been officially canceled or that it would return for a fourth season.

Casting
Alongside the series order announcement, it was confirmed that Brendan Gleeson and Anton Yelchin had been cast in the series' two lead roles. Following Yelchin's death in June 2016, it was announced that his role had been recast with Harry Treadaway assuming the part. In December 2016, it was announced that Kelly Lynch and Ann-Margret had been cast in the series. In January 2017, it was reported that Jharrel Jerome, Justine Lupe, and Breeda Wool, Scott Lawrence, Robert Stanton, and Ann Cusack had joined the main cast, that Mary-Louise Parker was cast a recurring character, and that Ann-Margret's role had been recast with Holland Taylor following an illness in Ann-Margret's family. On April 25, 2017, it was reported that Stephen King would have a cameo in the series. In January 2018, it was announced that Jack Huston, Maximiliano Hernandez, and Tessa Ferrer had been cast as series regulars in season two. In March 2019, Kate Mulgrew, Brett Gelman, and Natalie Paul joined the series for the third season. On April 25, 2019, Meg Steedle had been cast in a recurring role for the third season.

Filming
In February 2017, principal photography for the first season began in Charleston, South Carolina. That month, filming took place in the Wagener Terrace area of the city as well as at the Upper King Street restaurant Little Jack's Tavern. Filming concluded for the first season by the end of May 2017. In January 2018, Audience announced production for season two would commence the following month in South Carolina.

During filming on March 2, 2019, special effects technician Mike Wilks survived a near-electrocution on set.

Release

Marketing
On May 8, 2017, Audience released a series of "first look" images from the series. On June 5, 2017, Audience released a "behind-the-scenes" video for the series featuring interviews with the cast and crew. The following day, the first teaser trailer for the series was released. By the end of the month, Audience released a set of promotional photographs featuring the series' main cast.

On July 19, 2018, the series held a panel at San Diego Comic-Con in San Diego, California to promote season two. The panel featured executive producer and director Jack Bender as well as series stars Jack Huston, Max Hernandez, Breeda Wool, Justine Lupe, and Nancy Travis. On July 30, 2018, the official trailer for season two was released.

Distribution
The series airs on RTÉ1 in Ireland, on Canal+ in Poland, and on Starzplay in the United Kingdom.  The first three seasons of Mr. Mercedes were picked up in September 2020 by streaming service Peacock.

Reception

Critical response
The first season of Mr. Mercedes has been met with a positive response from critics. On the review aggregation website Rotten Tomatoes, the first season holds an 83% approval rating with an average rating of 6.42 out of 10 based on 29 reviews. The website's critical consensus reads, "Mr. Mercedes propels its tense, creepy narrative with quick-witted dialogue, strong characters, and terrifying surprises." Metacritic, which uses a weighted average, assigned the season a score of 71 out of 100 based on 17 critics, indicating "generally favorable reviews".

The second season also received a positive response from critics. On Rotten Tomatoes, the second season holds a 100% approval rating with an average rating of 7 out of 10 based on 11 reviews, with the critical consensus reading, "Mr. Mercedes gains a new, supernatural dimension in a rollicking second season that pits the talents of Brendan Gleeson and Harry Treadaway against each other, generating enough sparks to dazzle mystery aficionados and horror buffs alike." Metacritic assigned the season a score of 76 out of 100 based on 4 critics, indicating "generally favorable reviews".

Awards and nominations

Related series
The character of Holly Gibney that was first introduced in the Bill Hodges trilogy was one of the main characters in King's 2018 novel The Outsider. That novel was adapted for the 2020 miniseries by HBO, with the Gibney character portrayed by Cynthia Erivo.

Notes

References

External links
 
 

2010s American crime drama television series
2010s American horror television series
2010s American mystery television series
2010s American science fiction television series
2017 American television series debuts
2019 American television series endings
American thriller television series
Audience (TV network) original programming
Fictional rivalries
English-language television shows
Television series created by David E. Kelley
Television shows based on works by Stephen King
Television shows filmed in South Carolina
Television shows set in Cleveland